Kirill Fomich Tomashevich ((1852 – after 1909) was a deputy of State Duma of the Russian Empire of III convocation from the Mogilev Governorate. He was included in the faction of nationalists.

Russian politicians
1852 births
20th-century deaths
Russian nationalists